Mont Gerbier de Jonc is a mountain of volcanic origin located in the Massif Central in France. It is made of a type of rock called phonolite. It is the second most-visited site in the département of Ardèche, after the Ardèche Gorges.

Mont Gerbier de Jonc was formed 8 million years ago when a volcano erupted molten phonolite lava. The lava was too viscous to flow far and it cooled to form a lava dome of phonolite rock in the crater of the volcano. The lava dome has columnar jointing, which formed during cooling of the lava. The volcanic cone containing the lava dome was later eroded away, exposing the lava dome.

References

Massif Central
Volcanoes of Metropolitan France
Miocene lava domes
Landforms of Auvergne-Rhône-Alpes
Mountains of Auvergne-Rhône-Alpes